Piney River is a  tributary of the Colorado River in Eagle County, Colorado.  The river flows northwest from Upper Piney Lake in the Eagles Nest Wilderness to a confluence with the Colorado River.

See also
 List of rivers of Colorado
 List of tributaries of the Colorado River

References

Rivers of Colorado
Rivers of Eagle County, Colorado
Tributaries of the Colorado River in Colorado